Scott Michael Foster (born March 4, 1985) is an American actor. He is best known for his roles as Captain John Paul "Cappie" Jones in the ABC Family comedy-drama series Greek (2007–11), Leo Hendrie in the ABC Family drama Chasing Life  (2014–15) and as Nathaniel Plimpton III in Crazy Ex-Girlfriend (2017–19). Foster has also had recurring roles on Californication (2012), Halt and Catch Fire (2014), Once Upon a Time (2014), and You (2021).

Early life
Foster was born in Winfield, Illinois, at Central DuPage Hospital. He has two sisters. He later moved to Highland Village, Texas, a suburb of Dallas, where he became interested in acting as early as elementary school. He went to Briarhill Middle School, and later attended Edward S. Marcus High School where he was involved in theater until he graduated in 2003. He attended Collin College for one semester with a focus on acting, but soon left his studies to pursue a professional career in that field. He plays guitar and is the lead singer of his indie rock band "Siren's Eye". They released their first EP on iTunes, entitled "Red Room" on 15 December 2009.

Career
Foster appeared in the small indie film The Horrible Flowers, before landing the regular role in the ABC Family comedy-drama series, Greek. The series ran from 2007 to 2011. During his days on Greek, Foster also had the leading role in the independent film, Teenage Dirtbag. He later guest-starred on Law & Order: LA, Melissa & Joey, Friends with Benefits, The Closer, and Parenthood.

In 2012, Foster had recurring roles in the fifth season of Showtime comedy-drama series, Californication, and short-lived ABC paranormal horror series, The River. In 2013, he had the regular role in another short-lived ABC series, Zero Hour opposite Anthony Edwards and Carmen Ejogo. In 2014, Foster had recurring roles in AMC period drama, Halt and Catch Fire, and later in that year began appearing in the ABC Family drama series, Chasing Life as a love interest for the lead character. Also in 2014, he played the role of Kristoff in the fourth season of ABC fantasy series, Once Upon a Time.

In 2015, Foster began starring in the ABC prime time television soap opera, Blood & Oil alongside Don Johnson and Amber Valletta. In 2015, he was listed one of Variety’s "10 Actors to Watch".

In 2017, Foster began appearing as Nathaniel Plimpton III on the CW comedy-musical series Crazy Ex-Girlfriend.

In January 2021, it was announced that Foster had been cast in the recurring role of Ryan Goodwin on the third season of the Netflix thriller series You.

Filmography

Film

Television

References

External links
 
 

1985 births
Male actors from Dallas
American male television actors
Living people
People from Winfield, Illinois
American male film actors
American male soap opera actors
21st-century American male actors